The Swiss Leader Index (SLI) is an index comprising large and mid-cap companies primarily listed on SIX Swiss Exchange. It is made up of 30 of the largest and most liquid Swiss Performance Index (SPI) large- and mid-cap stocks. As a price index, the SLI is not adjusted for dividends, but there exists a total-return version as well.

The SPI was introduced on July 2, 2007 and computed back to December 30, 1999, with a baseline value of 1,000 points on this starting date.

The capping model of the SLI makes it suitable as a benchmark for a broader range of products and markets than other indices offered by SIX Swiss Exchange, because it is compatible with regulatory requirements in the European Union as well as in the United States. With its 9/4.5 caps, the SLI is more diversified, and its risk/return profile is more tilted towards smaller capitalizations, than other indices such as the SMI and SPI.

In 2020, the SLI, along with other SIX indices, was endorsed under the EU Benchmarks Regulation and is registered in ESMA, which means that it can be used as an underlying for financial products sold in the EU.

Rules

Universe
The SLI comprises the 20 securities of the SMI, as well as the largest 10 securities in the SMI MID.

Capped weightings
The largest four components of the SLI are capped at 9%. All other components, if necessary, are capped at 4.5%. The caps are enforced with a multiplication factor that is updated every three months.

This was made to conform the SLI to the EU's UCITS 5/10/40 rule, which says that:
 The value of any single position cannot be more than 10% of the fund's value, and
 all positions that are larger than 5% of the fund's value cannot, together, make up more than 40% of the fund's value.

Current constituents

As of September 20, 2021, the following 30 stocks make up the SLI index. Components marked as 1 have a 9% weight as of September 18, 2020.  Sizes are based on the SPI classification by market capitalization: L for SPI Large, M for SPI Mid.

Notes and references

Swiss stock market indices